"Mr. Bean in Room 426" is the eighth episode of the British television series Mr. Bean, produced by Tiger Television and Thames Television for Central Independent Television. It was first broadcast on ITV on 17 February 1993 and was watched by 14.31 million viewers during its original transmission. This was the first episode to consist of a single storyline and was shot entirely on location in Southsea.

Plot

Act 1: Checking In 
Mr. Bean decides to stay at the Queens Hotel for a bank holiday. He parks his Mini at the foot of the entrance stairs and fights with a bellboy over his suitcase, mistaking him for a thief, although he later trusts the bellboy with his steering wheel to move his Mini to a parking spot. As Bean checks in, a quiet man checks in as well and Bean tries to beat the man to his hotel room, but the man gets to the lift before him. In retaliation, Bean runs up the staircase and stops the lift on every floor. He almost succeeds in entering his room first, but struggles to unlock his door and the man ultimately enters his own room first.

Once inside his room, Bean toys with his new surroundings in several different ways, such as flicking the light switch on and off, making a call on the telephone, jumping on the bed, testing the remote control's signal range, and drilling holes in the wall to hang pictures. He then decides to have a bath, but realizes his room doesn't have a bathroom. Bean then hears running water in room 425 and learns about that room has an en suite bathroom. After the man in room 425 leaves, he uses his drill to cut a large hole in the bathroom wall. The vibration travels all the way down to the lobby, prompting the manager to investigate. Just as he knocks on the door to Bean's room, the man in room 425 complains that he cannot get the door open. The manager futilely tries to turn the handle and apologizes to the man, suggesting that it may be jammed. It turns out that Bean has locked the door and is taking a bath. Once he is finished, he hides the hole with his wardrobe and the shower curtain.

Act 2: The Rotten Oysters 
At dinnertime, Bean tries to beat his neighbour to the dining room, only to find that the lift is out of order. He goes to take the stairs, but gets stuck behind a slow-moving elderly woman. He climbs onto the opposite side of the banister to get past her, but ends up behind an equally slow-moving elderly man with two walking sticks. Now stuck between the two with insufficient space to repeat the same tactic, Bean is forced to go down slowly.

Once he reaches the restaurant, Bean cheats his way to the front of the queue and proceeds to take whatever food his neighbour is taking from the buffet, albeit double the quantity. He then sits down next to his neighbour and gluttonously eats whatever the neighbour is eating at a certain time. When the neighbour starts to eat his oysters, Bean gobbles all of them down, but the neighbour notices an odd smell coming from his oysters and asks the headwaiter about it. The headwaiter says that they have gone off and apologizes to the neighbour. Bean realizes that he has just consumed rotten oysters and begins to feel nauseous.

Act 3: Locked Out 
That night, Bean has a dream that involves his neighbour and the waiters laughing maliciously and force-feeding him the rotten oysters. Upon waking up, he feels hot and removes his pyjamas. He is about to go back to sleep when he hears loud music coming from room 427. Bean goes outside, knocks on the door and shushes loudly. The music stops and he walks back to his room, but his door closes and locks itself, leaving him trapped outside his room naked. Knowing he will be arrested for public nudity if seen, Bean covers himself with door signs and runs for the stairs, but finds the same elderly lady there. He heads back up to the corridor and crawls under the carpet and into the lift.

Upon reaching the lobby, Bean sneaks into the manager's workspace as the manager speaks to Danny La Rue, who is performing at the hotel. As La Rue gives the audience an encore, the manager tells the porter to take La Rue's suitcase to his car. The manager returns to his workspace and almost sees the suitcase moving several times, as Bean is hiding in it. The porter comes back and locks the suitcase, only to drop it on the front steps as he brings to the car. Mr. Bean then shows up at the counter in drag and asks for the key to room 426. As the manager looks for it, La Rue approaches Bean angrily, says to him, "Here, that's my frock," and yanks an earring off Bean's ear, causing Bean to shriek in pain.

Cast
Rowan Atkinson as Mr. Bean
Matthew Ashforde as the hotel porter
Michael Fenton Stevens as the man in Room 425 
Roger Brierley as the hotel manager
Danny La Rue as himself
Phyllis Calvert as old lady (uncredited)

Production 
This was the first episode to incorporate only one storyline instead of separate acts or sketches as well as the first to be shot entirely on location. The episode was filmed at the Queen's Hotel in the seaside resort of Southsea, Portsmouth, Hampshire. Principal photography began on 1 October 1992.

It was also the first full episode to be directed by Paul Weiland, previously the series' specialist director for film sequences. Another episode-length story, Mind the Baby, Mr. Bean, was also filmed in Southsea.

This was also the first episode to be commissioned and presented for the ITV network by Central Independent Television following the loss of Thames' ITV franchise in London. Central would also oversee commissioning and compliance for a number of other Thames independent productions, such as Minder, Wish You Were Here...? and Strike It Lucky, until the ITV Network Centre removed the requirement for a 'commissioning company' in the late 1990s.

References

External links 
 

Mr. Bean episodes
1993 British television episodes
Television episodes set in hotels
Television shows written by Rowan Atkinson
Television shows written by Robin Driscoll